Drugyel Higher Secondary School (DHSS) is a secondary school in Drugyel, Paro, Bhutan. It was established in 1994 by British High Commissioner for India, Sir Nicholas Fenn and Education Director of Bhutan, Thinley Gyamtsho. Aum Namgay Om was appointed as the first principal of the school. Based on 2009 examination results, the school was ranked fourth in the country by the Bhutanese government.

Location
DHSS is located under Tsento Gewog (Upper Paro valley), 22 km North of Paro International Airport. It lies just on the base of Taktsang Monastery (Tigers nest), which is a cliff hanging monastery about 900 meters uphill. DHSS lies halfway between two resorts in Bhutan, Aman Kora Resort to the north and Zhiwaling Resort to the south. The school lies at an altitude of about 2511 meters above sea level and within 27029’05.6" North Latitude and 89019’56.6" East Longitude.

School campus
The school gate is in the northern end which then leads downhill by a narrow-paved road. The classrooms are located in the northern end near the school gate. Student dorms are found below in the southern stretch. DHSS shares its campus with the first hearing-impaired students in Bhutan. This disabled school is mainly financed by the German NGO Star hours – We help children, the humanitarian association of the Bavarian Television, Munich. The school has an old multi-purpose hall and a football pitch right below it. The school campus is near to a local Basic health unit center.

Education and co-curricular activities
DHSS has been a top ranking school in Bhutan ever since its inception. The teaching faculty consist of both Bhutanese and Non-Bhutanese  (Indians) experienced teachers. Students are also taught on agricultural programmes to impart basic knowledge, skills and techniques on different aspects of farming (growing common vegetables. A group of 33 students from Drugyel High School visited the National Soil Service Centre on 25 September 2013 to learn more about soils, its importance and sustainable management.

Notable alumni
Bhutanese actor Tandin Sonam passed his high school from DHSS. He made his debut in Bhutanese film industry with his first film Sleeping Beauty. The movie was played by him as a debutant actor, who is the protagonist, who believes that he will meet his dream girl one day. He is also a singer and sang songs like "chued chued bumo" and " Yasi mey". Actress Tandin Bhida was also a student of DHSS. At 22 years old, she was nominated for national film awards for supporting actress.

References

External links
 School website
 Bhutan Today newspaper
 Disabled students
 airport distance
 http://www.education.gov.bt/
 https://web.archive.org/web/20140516232650/http://yoezerling.edu.bt/

Schools in Bhutan